Eduardo Alejandro Romero (17 July 1954 – 13 February 2022) was an Argentine professional golfer. Nicknamed "El Gato" ("The Cat"), he won over 80 professional tournaments around the world, including eight on the European Tour and five on the Champions Tour, with two senior majors; he also won over 50 times in South America and was a member of the Argentine team at the World Cup on 14 occasions.

Early life
Romero was born in Córdoba to a family of modest means.

Professional career
Romero turned professional in 1982. He played extensively in Latin America on the Tour de las Americas and its predecessor the "South American Tour", but his international profile is mainly based on his success on the more prestigious European Tour and in senior golf in the United States and Europe. He reached the top 20 of the Official World Golf Ranking.

He first played on the European Tour in 1985 and was a full member from 1988 to 2005. He had 8 tournament victories and seven top twenty placings on the Order of Merit. In 2002 he became the third oldest winner on the European Tour (behind Des Smyth and Neil Coles) when he won the Scottish Open just three days before his 48th birthday. Romero came fifth on the Order of Merit for 2002. Romero turned fifty in 2004, and just a few days later he finished in a tie for second at his first senior tournament, the Senior British Open. In 2005 he won his first senior title at the European Seniors Tour's Travis Perkins Senior Masters, and he won the Wentworth Senior Masters in both 2005 and 2006. In 2006, he lost in a playoff against Loren Roberts for the Senior British Open Championship and won a playoff against Lonnie Nielsen for the JELD-WEN Tradition for his first Champions Tour win and major. He was the Champions Tour's 2006 Rookie of the Year. He won the U.S. Senior Open, his second major, at The Broadmoor in Colorado Springs in 2008.

Romero won more than eighty tournaments in Latin America. He represented Argentina in the World Cup and the Alfred Dunhill Cup numerous times, and he participated in the UBS Cup in 2002 and 2003. He also appeared on The Golf Channel's The Big Break series. 

Romero's nicknamed was "El Gato" ("The Cat").

Death
Romero died on 13 February 2022, at the age of 67 at his home in Villa Allende, Córdoba Province, Argentina. The Abierto del Centro, played on the PGA Tour Latinoamérica in April 2022, was renamed in memory of Romero.

Professional wins (75)

European Tour wins (8)

European Tour playoff record (2–1)

Argentine Tour wins (44)
This list is incomplete
1983 (3) Argentine PGA Championship, La Cumbre Open, Highland Grand Prix
1984 (8) Carilo Open, Abierto del Litoral, La Cumbre Open, Center Open, San Martin Grand Prix, Chaco Open, Ituzaingo Grand Prix, Jockey Club Rosario Open
1986 (1) Argentine PGA Championship
1987 (4) Sevel Grand Prix, North Open, Los Cardales Grand Prix, American Express Grand Prix
1988 (4) South Open, Punta del Este Open (Uruguay), Center Open, Norpatagonico Open
1989 (3) Argentine Open, Sevel Grand Prix, Los Lagartos Grand Prix
1990 (2) Argentine PGA Championship, Center Open
1991 (3) Acantilados Grand Prix, Center Open, North Open (tie with Adan Sowa)
1992 (3) Argentine PGA Championship, South Open, North Open
1993 (1) Argentine PGA Championship
1994 (1) North Open
1995 (2) Punta del Este Open (Uruguay), Center Open
1996 (2) Argentine PGA Championship, Center Open
1997 (2) Argentine PGA Championship, Las Delicias Open
1998 (2) Acantilados Grand Prix, North Open
1999 (3) Argentine PGA Championship, Center Open, La Cumbre Open

Córdoba Tour wins (5)
1982 (4) Center Cuyo Tournament, Bell Ville Tournament, Córdoba PGA Championship, La Cumbre Tournament
1984 (1) Bell Ville Tournament

Other wins (11)
1980 Argentine Caddie's Tournament
1984 Chile Open
1987 Sierra de la Ventana Tournament (Arg), South American team (Arg), Prince of Wales Open (Chile), Santo Domingo Open (Chile), Sports Frances Open (Chile)
1997 Las Brisas Open (Chile)
1998 Mexican Open, Las Brisas Open (Chile)
2000 Desafio de Maestros (Arg)

Champions Tour wins (5)

Champions Tour playoff record (1–1)

European Senior Tour wins (2)

European Senior Tour playoff record (0–1)

Results in major championships

CUT = missed the half-way cut
"T" = tied

Summary

Most consecutive cuts made – 7 (1995 U.S. Open – 1998 Open Championship)
Longest streak of top-10s – 1 (twice)

Results in The Players Championship

CUT = missed the halfway cut

Results in World Golf Championships

1Cancelled due to 9/11

QF, R16, R32, R64 = Round in which player lost in match play
"T" = Tied
NT = No tournament

Champions Tour major championships

Wins (2)

Results timeline
Results not in chronological order before 2016.

CUT = missed the halfway cut
"T" indicates a tie for a place

Team appearances
this list in incomplete
World Cup (representing Argentina): 1983, 1984, 1987, 1988, 1991, 1993, 1994, 1995, 1999, 2000, 2001, 2002, 2003, 2004
Alfred Dunhill Cup (representing Argentina): 1989, 1990, 1993, 1995, 1997, 1998, 2000
UBS Cup (representing the Rest of the World): 2002, 2003 (tie)

See also
1985 PGA Tour Qualifying School graduates
1994 PGA Tour Qualifying School graduates
List of golfers with most European Tour wins

References

External links

Argentine male golfers
European Tour golfers
PGA Tour golfers
European Senior Tour golfers
PGA Tour Champions golfers
Winners of senior major golf championships
Sportspeople from Córdoba, Argentina
1954 births
2022 deaths